Heroes of the Equinox is volume eight in the French comic book (or bande dessinée) science fiction series Valérian and Laureline created by writer Pierre Christin and artist Jean-Claude Mézières.

Synopsis

Valérian, accompanied by Laureline, is one of four representatives from different races dispatched to the planet Simlane. Landing their astroship at Simlane's astroport, Valérian discovers he is the last to arrive. They are greeted by the members of the Simlane Great Assembly and taken to the city, which is crumbling and falling into ruin. The entire population is made up of old men and women. The head of the assembly explains that the people of Simlane are sterile and that every hundred equinoxes a new generation must take over. The best of the men of Simlane are sent to conquer the Island of Children but this time all that have left have either never returned or have returned mutilated in some way and no children have been forthcoming. So the leaders of Simlane have resorted to seeking champions from other worlds in order to repopulate the planet.

Arriving at the Great Theatre, Valérian meets the other champions – Irmgaal of Krahan, Ortzog of Bourgnouf and Blumflum of Malalum. Each in turn demonstrates their powers: Irmgaal cleaves a great rock in two with his flaming sword, Ortzog uses his mighty chains of freedom to smash a pillar, Blumflum destroys another pillar by growing vines around it that strangle it. Beside them Valérian looks rather pathetic when he uses his sharp shooting skills to shoot the top off one of the remaining pillars. The four champions are brought to the pier to set off for Filene, the Island of Children where they must reach the summit. The challenge will last three days – on the first day they will confront material forces, the second monsters from the animal kingdom and on the third traps of the spirit. Laureline asks what happens after the third day, she is told that nobody knows since those who succeed never return – children in their image arrive in vessels pushed by the last wave of the equinox. Just then all four champions fly away from Simlane towards Filene.

Reaching Filene, each champion chooses a different route to follow to the summit of the mountain. Valérian is challenged by rockfalls and narrow crevices, Irmgaal by stifling mists and lava flows, Ortzog by deadly cold that almost freezes him solid and Blumflum by the blazing sun of a searing desert. But, while Irmgaal's sword hacks through the molten rock, Ortzog's chains shatter the ice and Blumflum's seeds create an oasis in the desert, Valérian loses his footing a tumbles to the bottom of a rocky crevasse.

The following morning Irmgaal finds himself in a jungle facing a dragon-like monster, Ortzog fights off a herd of giant armoured buffalo and Blumflum has to deal with giant birds. Still trying to climb out of the crevasse, Valérian has to deal with a pack of rats.

Dawn breaks on the third morning and the final stage of the competition begins. While Valérian is still climbing, Irmgaal, Ortzog and Blumflum all reach the summit at the same time. Before them lies a beautiful palace. A fight breaks out between all three as they struggle to be the first to reach it. They are stopped by an old man who introduces himself as the Examiner. He reminds them that the challenge of the third day will be a spiritual not a physical test.

The Examiner brings them to the Dome of Imaginary Revelations where each champion is asked to speak about how they see Simlane's future should they succeed and father the next generation. As each champion speaks, images of the world they would build appear  in the dome. Irmgaal goes first and promises to bring space travel to Simlane with which they will use to spread Simlane's civilising influence across the Galaxy. As he delivers his speech, we see images of mighty armies and powerful space fleets conquering worlds and crushing all opposition. Ortzog goes next, he intends make Simlane more efficient – tourists will be herded on specially marked itineraries, luxury buildings will be demolished to make way for heavy industry and intensive agriculture. All this will be run by a powerful centralised bureaucracy which will promote equality for all. Simlane will spread its influence through protective interplanetary agreements with deserving worlds. Blumflum now takes the stand. He will create a world for harmony where everyone will leave the cities to crumble and return to a simpler life closer to nature where all will submit to a benevolent religion of meditation. The images displayed, however, show a planet ravaged by starvation and poverty. At last, Valérian, exhausted, reaches the summit of the mountain. The Examiner asks him about his vision of Simlane's future. Valérian explains that he has no clear idea, that it's not up to him to determine her future and he would hope that everyone would try to be happy in their own way. The trials over, the four champions are brought to the Palace of the Supreme Mother. They are given apartments and told that the winner will be declared in the morning.

The next day the winner has been announced. To everyone's astonishment, it is Valérian. A whirlwind descends and sweeps the other three champions away back to Simlane. Valérian is led into a chamber where he meets the Supreme Mother of Filene a giant blonde woman. She explains to Valérian that she chose him because he was happy to leave the children to determine their own future. She explains that she rejected the previous champions because they were too interested in impressing tourists than how their children would turn out. She shows Valérian a room where the previous successful champions live out their lives – they have all shrunk to just a few inches in height. The Supreme Mother takes Valérian in her arms.

Back at Simlane, the Irmgaal, Ortzog and Blumflum have washed up on the shore. Laureline, worried about Valérian, sets sail to the island in search of him. Arriving at the harbour in Filene, she sees a huge flotilla of ships ready to set sail. She manages to climb to the top of the mountain with little difficulty, unlike the four champions before her, and as she reaches the Palace, the doors open and thousands of toddlers, all bearing some resemblance to Valérian, pour out and make their way to the boats in the harbour. Laureline is greeted by the Examiner and demands to be brought to see Valérian. The Examiner obliges – Valérian is in the room with the previous successful candidates. Like them, he has shrunk to only a few inches in height. Laureline is furious that Valérian has been unfaithful to her.

The ships arrive at Simlane and disgorge their cargo of children. The old people of Simlane are delighted with the children and can die in peace. Laureline takes Valérian with her and takes off in the astroship for Galaxity. Valérian begs Laureline, who is still angry at Valérian's actions, to call Galaxity's medical service so he can be restored to his normal size.

Main characters
 Valérian, a spatio-temporal agent from Galaxity, future capital of Earth, in the 28th century
 Laureline, originally from France in the 11th century, now a spatio-temporal agent of Galaxity in the 28th century
 Irmgaal, champion of Krahan, planet of the great black warriors
 Ortzog, champion of industrious Bourgnouf
 Blumflum, champion of iridescent Malalum
 The head of the Simlane Great Assembly
 The Examiner from the Dome of Imaginary Revelations
 The Supreme Mother of Filene, female progenitor of the Simlane race

Setting
The planet Simlane. The people of Simlane have no interest in space travel but are happy to welcome tourists to their magnificent city which boasts many fine buildings including the Palace of Truth, where judgments are passed; the Trade Dome, the city's most handsome market and the Great Theater, capable of holding Simlane's entire population. The city is ruled by the Simlane Great Assembly.

Across the sea lies Filene, the Island of Children. The people of Simlane send their finest champions there every one hundredth equinox. The children of those who succeed in conquering it return on vessels borne by the last wave of the equinox. At the base of the island lies a harbour with a lighthouse – it is from there that the children of each new generation set sail. At the top of a mighty mountain lies the Dome of Imaginary Revelations, where each champion must undergo a spiritual test, and the Palace of the Supreme Mother of Filene. Inside the palace are apartments for the prospective champions and rooms for the successful ones to live out the rest of their lives there following the production of the children.

Notes
 This album is a parody of American superhero comics – all of the action shots are drawn in the American comic book style with suitable accompanying sound effects. The most explicit reference is in plate 14 when two bystanders comment on the champions departing for Filene. "Those four are fantastic!" says the first (a reference to the Marvel comic The Fantastic Four). "Yes, really super those heroes," replies the second.
 The story also serves as a parody of different forms of totalitarian regimes - obviously, Irmgaal as a fascist, Ortzog as a communist and Blumflum as a premonition of ecofascism which could be feared on the rise when the story was written. In this context, Valerian unknowingly takes a classical liberal stand when he lets the child be free to form their own future.
 Several panels mimic the styles of other French comic book artists of the era, the visions of Irmgaal being drawn in the style of Philippe Druillet, while Blumflum rides the pterodactyl-like creature from Arzach by author Jean 'Moebius' Giraud.
 This album was translated into English by Suzi Baker and published in 1984 by Dargaud USA in the United States of America and in 1985 by Hodder Dargaud in the United Kingdom. It was later republished in black and white in July 1996 by Fantasy Flight Publishing (an offshoot of Fantasy Flight Games) as a two-part comic book.

1978 graphic novels
Valérian and Laureline